Benaulim is a village in the state of Goa, India. Located in Salcete taluka of South Goa district, it neighbours Colva village to the north, Margao in the northeast and Varca village to the south. During  Portuguese rule, it was one of the nine communidades in Salcete. Benaulim is the birthplace of St Joseph Vaz, who was a priest and missionary in Sri Lanka. Benaulim is home to several traditional carpenters, and has long been known as Goa's 'village of carpenters'. Contemporary Benaulim is a popular seaside resort, renowned for its beautiful rice fields, balmy weather and golden sand beaches. It also houses Goa's only Don Bosco Animation Centre. There are two big churches in Benaulim. The Holy Trinity Church in Mazilvaddo is a modern church built over the centuries-old chapel of the Loiola Pereira family. The St John the Baptist Church in Povacao area closer to Colva, is where St Joseph Vaz was baptised.

In 2016, Benaulim hosted the 8th BRICS Summit.

Etymology 
The village was known as Banahalli or Banawali (the village of the arrow) before the advent of the Portuguese. Ban is the Sanskrit word for 'arrow' and Halli the Kannada word for 'village'. According to the Sahyadrikhanda of the Skanda Purana, Lord Parashurama shot his arrow into the sea and commanded the sea god Varuna recede up to the point where his arrow landed. The arrow is said to have landed at Banahalli. The area was then settled by Goud Saraswat Brahmins from northern India.

History 
Ancient Banahalli was the site of the Katyayani Baneshvar temple dedicated to the Hindu deities Shiva and Parvati. The temple ruins can be still found in the village. The deities were shifted to Aversa in North Canara (modern Uttara Kannada district) in the sixteenth century.

The tall type coconut cultivar, 'Banawali Green Round', the landrace of Benaulim, was selected and released as 'Pratap' in 1987 for cultivation in coastal Maharashtra by the Konkan Krishi Vidyapeeth, Dapoli owing to its superior morphological and fruiting characteristics and high yielding nature.

Geography
Benaulim is located at 
.

Demographics 

Benaulim has population of 11,919 of which 5,818 are males and 6,101 are females, as per Census of India 2011. Child population within the age group of 0-6 is 1,235 which is 10.36% of total population. Female sex ratio is 1,049 against the Goa state average of 973. Moreover, the child sex ratio is around 992 compared to the state average of 942.

Literacy is 89.25% higher than the state average of 88.70%. Male literacy is around 92.15% while female literacy rate is 86.51%. Out of the total population, 4,316 were engaged in work or business activity. Of this 3,087 were males while 1,229 were females.

Benaulim has a predominantly Christian population (82.68%), followed by Hinduism (13.05%) and Islam (3.90%). Schedule Caste (SC) constitutes 0.99% while Schedule Tribe (ST) were 0.26% of total population.

Tourist attractions 

Benaulim has three beaches: The main Benaulim beach is neighboured by Trinity beach to the south and Sernabatim beach to the north. Benaulim beach is popular among the locals and tourists alike. Apart from sunbathing and swimming, there are also options of parasailing, jet skiing, boat riding and wind surfing. Benaulim beaches are pristine, as they are relatively undeveloped. Due to reduced human movement during the coronavirus lockdown, five adult Olive Ridley turtles washed up on Benaulim beach after decades, in June 2020. The turtles were trapped in fishing nets on the beach and were rescued by Benaulim fisherman Pele and his friends.

Benaulim's main market is located near Maria Hall (which serves as an event hall), a community centre, where most accommodation, restaurants, grocers and chemists are concentrated.

There is one luxury hotel in Benaulim, Taj Exotica Resort & Spa, Goa. There is a hidden side of Benaulim beach entrance behind the resort.

Government and politics
Benaulim is part of Benaulim (Goa Assembly constituency) and South Goa (Lok Sabha constituency).

Notable people

Gallery

Citations

References 

 
Cities and towns in South Goa district
Beaches of South Goa district
Beaches of Goa

mr:बाणावली